The 2022 Viaplay Nordic Darts Masters was the second staging of the tournament by the Professional Darts Corporation, and the second entry in the 2022 World Series of Darts. The tournament featured 16 players (eight 'elite' PDC players and eight regional qualifiers) and was held at the Forum Copenhagen in Copenhagen, Denmark on 10–11 June 2022.

Michael van Gerwen was the defending champion after defeating Fallon Sherrock 11–7 in the 2021 final, but he lost to James Wade in the quarter-finals.

Dimitri Van den Bergh won his first World Series of Darts title after defeating Gary Anderson 11–5 in the final.

Prize money
The total prize fund remained at £60,000.

Qualifiers
The PDC announced the 8 players who would be their representatives at the event on 11 April 2022, including Fallon Sherrock, who was denied her chance to appear on the 2020 World Series of Darts circuit, owing to the COVID-19 pandemic.

The seedings were based on the results from previous World Series event held earlier in the year.

  (semi-finals)
  (quarter-finals)
  (quarter-finals)
  (quarter-finals)
  (semi-finals)
  (runner-up)
  (quarter-finals)
  (champion)

The Nordic qualifiers consisted of their three PDC Tour card holders (Darius Labanauskas, Madars Razma and Vladimir Andersen), plus the two highest ranking players on the PDC European Tour Order of Merit from Denmark, as well as the highest ranked players from Sweden, Finland and Iceland.

Draw
The draw was made on June 8 by Barry Hearn.

References

Nordic Darts Masters
Nordic Darts Masters
World Series of Darts
Sports competitions in Copenhagen
Nordic Darts Masters